Wheat is an unincorporated community in Wetzel County, West Virginia, United States. Its post office opened in 1837, closed in 1950.

The community was named for wheat fields near the original town site.

References 

Unincorporated communities in West Virginia
Unincorporated communities in Wetzel County, West Virginia